RFC Liégeois is a Belgian rugby union club currently competing in the Belgian Elite League.

The club is based in Liège in Liège Province.
The official colours of the club are red and blue.

History
The club was founded in 1958 and has never won the Belgian Elite League, they have however reached the semi-finals of the Belgian Cup. They were promoted to the Belgian Elite League following the 2012/13 season when they finished top of Division Two. .

See also
 Rugby union in Belgium
 Belgian Elite League
 Belgian Cup (Rugby Union)

References

External links
 Official site

Belgian rugby union clubs